Jikhashkari or Djikhasjkari is a mountainous village in Zugdidi District, Samegrelo-Zemo Svaneti region, Georgia in Chanistsqali river gorge.

History 
The XVIII century Jikhashkari fortress  was an important trading post on Black Sea Silk Road Corridor in historical Odishi. The fortress citadel on a mountaintop and a lower fortress connected to the  large courtyard. The
Summer palace of the Dadiani family, the rulers of Samegrelo,  used to be here.

See also
 Chakvinji fortress
 Samegrelo-Zemo Svaneti

References 

Populated places in Samegrelo-Zemo Svaneti